The 2017–18 Marshall Thundering Herd women's basketball team represents the Marshall University during the 2017–18 NCAA Division I women's basketball season. The Thundering Herd, led by first year head coach Tony Kemper, play their home games at the Cam Henderson Center and are members of Conference USA. They finished the season 9–20, 3–13 in C-USA play to finish in last place. They failed to qualify for the Conference USA women's tournament.

Roster

Schedule

|-
!colspan=9 style=| Non-conference regular season

|-
!colspan=9 style=| Conference USA regular season

See also
2017–18 Marshall Thundering Herd men's basketball team

References

Marshall Thundering Herd women's basketball seasons
Marshall
Marsh
Marsh